Morgan Branch may refer to:

Morgan Branch (Little Third Fork), a stream in Missouri
Morgan Branch (North Wyaconda River), a stream in Missouri